Elections to Epping Forest Council were held on 1 May 2008.  One third of the council was up for election and the council remained in Conservative control.

This election saw the largest Green competition. The Chigwell Residents Association's sole councillor, John Knapman, defected to join the Conservatives and won his seat of Chigwell Village. The Loughton Residents Association gained a seat, whilst the BNP lost almost half its representation, despite reaching a record high vote share in the district.

One-third of council up for election. No elections this year in Broadley Common, Epping Upland and Nazeing, Chipping Ongar, Greensted and Marden Ash, Hastingwood, Matching and Sheering Village, Lambourne, Lower Nazeing, Lower Sheering, North Weald Bassett, Roydon, Shelley, Waltham Abbey High Beach or Waltham Abbey Paternoster.

By-elections

Loughton Alderton by-election

Waltham Abbey Honey Lane by-election

Grange Hill by-election

Lower Sheering by-election

Results

Buckhurst Hill East

Buckhurst Hill West

Chigwell Row

Chigwell Village

Epping Hemnall

Epping Lindsey and Thornwood Common

Grange Hill

High Ongar, Willingale and The Rodings

Loughton Alderton

Loughton Broadway

Loughton Fairmead

Loughton Forest

Loughton Roding

Loughton St. John's

Loughton St. Mary's

Moreton and Fyfield

Passingford

Theydon Bois

Waltham Abbey Honey Lane

Waltham Abbey North East

Waltham Abbey South West

References

Epping Forest District Council elections
Epping
2000s in Essex